This is an incomplete list of New York State Historic Markers in Franklin County, New York.

Listings county-wide

See also
List of New York State Historic Markers
National Register of Historic Places listings in New York
List of National Historic Landmarks in New York

References

Franklin County, New York
Franklin